Kodumudikal is a 1981 Indian Malayalam film, directed by J. Sasikumar and produced by K. K. Nambiar. The film stars Prem Nazir, Jayabharathi, Adoor Bhasi and Kanakadurga in the lead roles. The film has musical score by M. K. Arjunan.

Cast

Soundtrack
The music was composed by M. K. Arjunan and the lyrics were written by Pappanamkodu Lakshmanan.

References

External links

VIEW THE FILM
{https://www.youtube.com/watch?v=_xT_NbRfZpQ KODUMUDIKAL}MALAYALAM FILM

1981 films
1980s Malayalam-language films
Films directed by J. Sasikumar